Mario Zorzi (23 July 1910 – 17 February 1944) was an Italian sports shooter. He competed at the 1932 Summer Olympics and 1936 Summer Olympics. He was killed in a bombing raid during World War II.

References

External links
 

1910 births
1944 deaths
Italian male sport shooters
Olympic shooters of Italy
Shooters at the 1932 Summer Olympics
Shooters at the 1936 Summer Olympics
Sportspeople from Trentino
Italian civilians killed in World War II
Deaths by airstrike during World War II
20th-century Italian people